Gholaman-e Sofla (also Romanized as Gholāmān-e Soflá; also known as Gholāmān and Golāmān) is a village in Shurab Rural District, Veysian District, Dowreh County, Lorestan Province, Iran. At the 2006 census, its population was 173, in 36 families.

References 

Towns and villages in Dowreh County